Métropole Nice Côte d'Azur is the métropole, an intercommunal structure, centred on the city of Nice. It is located in the Alpes-Maritimes department, in the Provence-Alpes-Côte d'Azur region, southeastern France. It was created in December 2011, replacing the previous Communauté urbaine Nice Côte d'Azur and the communautés de communes of les stations du Mercantour, La Tinée and Vésubie-Mercantour. In 2013 the commune Coaraze left the métropole, and in 2014 the communes Bonson, Le Broc, Gattières and Gilette joined it. In January 2022 the communes Drap and Châteauneuf-Villevieille joined the métropole. Its area is 1479.7 km2. Its population was 545,873 in 2018 (incl. the communes that joined in 2022), of which 341,032 are located in Nice proper.

Communes 
The 51 communes of the métropole are:

Aspremont
Bairols
Beaulieu-sur-Mer
Belvédère
La Bollène-Vésubie
Bonson
Le Broc
Cagnes-sur-Mer
Cap-d'Ail
Carros
Castagniers
Châteauneuf-Villevieille
Clans
Colomars
Drap
Duranus
Èze
Falicon
Gattières
Gilette
La Gaude
Ilonse
Isola
Lantosque
Levens
Marie
Nice
Rimplas
Roquebillière
La Roquette-sur-Var
Roubion
Roure
Saint-André-de-la-Roche
Saint-Blaise
Saint-Dalmas-le-Selvage
Saint-Étienne-de-Tinée
Saint-Jean-Cap-Ferrat
Saint-Jeannet
Saint-Laurent-du-Var
Saint-Martin-du-Var
Saint-Martin-Vésubie
Saint-Sauveur-sur-Tinée
La Tour
Tournefort 
Tourrette-Levens
La Trinité
Utelle
Valdeblore
Venanson
Vence
Villefranche-sur-Mer

References

External links
  Official website

Nice
Nice
Nice Côte d'Azur